Upornikovskaya is a rural locality (a stanitsa) and the administrative center of Upornikovskoye Rural Settlement, Nekhayevsky District, Volgograd Oblast, Russia. The population was 1,197 as of 2010. There are 18 streets.

Geography 
Upornikovskaya is located on the Kalach Upland, on the Akishevka River, 26 km southeast of Nekhayevskaya (the district's administrative centre) by road. Pankinsky is the nearest rural locality.

Notable people 
 

Dmitri Kostrov (born 1981), Russian former professional footballer

References 

Rural localities in Nekhayevsky District